Claudio Patricio Núñez Caamaño (born October 16, 1975) is a Chilean former footballer who played as a striker. He is nicknamed "El Diablo", which means, "the Devil".

He made his name playing for Tigres UANL, where he had his most success.

Career
As a child, Núñez was with Humberto Nelson in his city of birth, then he joined Santiago Wanderers youth system. After playing during four seasons for the club, he moved to Monterrey, Mexico, to play with Tigres in 1996. Tigres had just been privatized after a crisis that ended with the team's relegation to Primera División A. In 1998, he played on loan at Universidad Católica.  

His incredible number of goals in Tigres quickly made him a team hero. He was instrumental in returning Tigres to the First Division.

He played 10 seasons with Tigres, 8 in First Division, in which he scored over 40 goals.

He played many Clásico Regiomontano matches, against Tigres arch-rival Rayados de Monterrey. He became the maximum scorer in the history of Tigres for matches of this kind, with eight goals. His record was tied by Walter Gaitán in January 2007.

An injury separated him from the fields, and Tigres consequently separated him from the team in 2001. In 2002, he moved to play with Puebla F.C., a team that has been relegated to Primera División A.

He used to wear the number 16 on his back for every match he played.

In 2003, he returned to Santiago Wanderers, making 11 appearances.

In 2005, he played his first Copa Libertadores de América with Tigres, where he scored some goals.

Nuñez has also played for Unión Española and Everton in Chile and Al-Shoalah in Saudi Arabia.

For his country Nuñez played 31 matches scoring 4 goals between 1996 and 2003.

A farewell Clásico Regiomontano match where Nuñez played with special guests from Tigres and Monterrey was scheduled for August 4, 2009 at the Estadio Universitario, Tigres' home stadium.

Post-retirement
He has played fast football with Monterrey Flash.

In 2017, he started a football academy, what ended. Next, he has worked for Azteca 7 as an analyst.

Personal life
He lives in Monterrey with his wife.

At the beginning of his playing career, he was nicknamed Huracán Porteño (Hurricane from Valparaíso) due to his speed. Since he was a player of Tigres in Mexico, he is well-known as Diablo Núñez (The DEvil Núñez).

Honours
Santiago Wanderers
 Segunda División de Chile: 1995

Everton
 Primera División de Chile (1): 2008 Apertura

References

External links

Claudio Níñez at MemoriaWanderers  

1975 births
Living people
Sportspeople from Valparaíso
Chilean footballers
Chilean expatriate footballers
Chile international footballers
Primera B de Chile players
Chilean Primera División players
Santiago Wanderers footballers
Club Deportivo Universidad Católica footballers
Unión Española footballers
Everton de Viña del Mar footballers
Ascenso MX players
Liga MX players
Tigres UANL footballers
Club Puebla players
Saudi Professional League players
Al-Shoulla FC players
Chilean expatriate sportspeople in Mexico
Chilean expatriate sportspeople in Saudi Arabia
Expatriate footballers in Mexico
Expatriate footballers in Saudi Arabia
1997 Copa América players
1999 Copa América players
Association football forwards
Chilean association football commentators